Conus lindae is a species of sea snail, a marine gastropod mollusk in the family Conidae, the cone snails and their allies.  Conus lindae is the type species of the subgenus Lindaconus Petuch, 2002.

Like all species within the genus Conus, these snails are predatory and venomous. They are capable of "stinging" humans, therefore live ones should be handled carefully or not at all.

Description 

Original description: "Shell solid, stocky, broad across shoulder, with relatively low spire; shoulder distinctly rounded; spire whorls slightly canaliculated; body whorl shiny, highly polished, with waxy feel; aperture narrow; protoconch very large, rounded, mamillate; shell color varying from pure white(paratype, Key collection) to pale pink, overlaid with 2 bands of salmon-pink dots (holotype); wide bands of salmon-pink blotches arranged with one above mid-body and one below mid-body near anterior end; rounded shoulder and canaliculate spire whorls marked with evenly-spaced, thin, radiating, pale salmon-orange flammules; interior of aperture white; periostracum thin, smooth, yellow, translucent."

The maximum recorded shell length is 31 mm.

Distribution
Locus typicus: "Southern coast of Grand Bahama Island, Bahamas."

This marine species occurs in deep water off the Bahamas.

Habitat 
Minimum recorded depth is 240 m. Maximum recorded depth is 250 m.

References

 Petuch, E. J. 1987. New Caribbean Molluscan Faunas. 55, plate 9, figure 9–10.
 Filmer R.M. (2001). A Catalogue of Nomenclature and Taxonomy in the Living Conidae 1758–1998. Backhuys Publishers, Leiden. 388pp
 Tucker J.K. & Tenorio M.J. (2009) Systematic classification of Recent and fossil conoidean gastropods. Hackenheim: Conchbooks. 296 pp.
 Puillandre N., Duda T.F., Meyer C., Olivera B.M. & Bouchet P. (2015). One, four or 100 genera? A new classification of the cone snails. Journal of Molluscan Studies. 81: 1–23

External links
 The Conus Biodiversity website
 Cone Shells - Knights of the Sea
 

lindae
Gastropods described in 1987